Mock the Week is a British topical satirical celebrity panel show, created by Dan Patterson and Mark Leveson. It was produced by Angst Productions for BBC Two, and was broadcast from 5 June 2005 to 4 November 2022. The programme was presented by Dara Ó Briain and featured regular appearances by comedian Hugh Dennis, as well as guest appearances by a variety of stand-up comedians, some of whom had regular appearances in several series.

The format of the programme saw six comedians divided into two teams and performing on a faux game show, in which the quiz aspect of answering questions relating to major and regional news items, all taken from the week before each episode's filming, is sidelined to focus on satirical, topical discussions on news items, stand-up routines, and the use of improvisational comedy. Every series also included a compilation episode featuring notable scenes, out-takes and additional footage cut out after filming, with repeats of episodes being frequently shown on the channel Dave, with high viewing figures.

Format

Mock the Week focused on six panellists, all comedians, split into two teams, in which they compete over four rounds, presided over by host Dara Ó Briain. Although the programme maintained a quiz aspect to the format, which featured questions on news items taken from those made during the week before an episode's filming, it was largely sidelined completely with a focus on comedy derived from topical, satirical discussions on the subject of each question, as well as from rounds featuring either stand-up routines by certain panellists, or improvisation comedy. Unlike Have I Got News for You, a similar topical, satirical programme that maintains a similar format but without the stand-up routines and improvisational comedy, Mock the Weeks format did not use team captains or maintain a proper scoring system – teams generally win a round depending on who Dara, the host, deemed won it, including the episode.

Each episode was edited to feature about four rounds from those filmed and edited by production staff, to fit a 30-minute timeslot. Some content not used was often retained for use in a compilation episode, which also included outtakes and highlights from the series. Although the first two series featured a multitude of different rounds for use, most of these were later abolished, leaving the programme to primarily use the following rounds in each episode:
 Picture of the Week: An image round in which panellists are shown a photograph from a news item and must identify the related story from it. The round usually focuses on panellists giving comedic answers that are deliberately wrong or mock the subject(s) of the image. The in-joke is Hugh Dennis finally saying the obvious answer, such as "That is Boris Johnson". The round generally does not conclude then, as both the host and panellists will usually enter topical, satirical discussion on the news item, including any additional questions given by the host.
 Wheel of News: A stand-up challenge in which a handful of panellists must perform a stand-up routine, with each basing it on a subject determined by a "Random Topic Generator" (e.g. Education). The host often introduces the round with a title that is a comical reference to a recent event. The round initially featured most of the panellists appearing in the episode, but was gradually reduced to two panellists to provide more time for their routines.
 If This is the Answer, What is the Question?: A round in which panellists are given the answer to a question on a topic and attempt to reveal what the question is, related to a current news story. The round usually involves panellists giving comedic questions that the answer could be connected to, and continues until the host prompts one member to give the correct question. The round generally does not conclude when this happens, as both the host and panellists will usually enter topical, satirical discussion on the news item, including any additional questions given by the host.
 Scenes We'd Like to See: An improvisation round, operating similar to "Scenes from a Hat" from Whose Line Is It Anyway?, in which panellists are given two topics and must provide comedic suggestions and ideas for each one, with the host buzzing each panellist after they give an idea in order to let another come forward with their suggestion. An example of a topic for comedic suggestions could be "Commercials That Never Made it to Air".

On occasion the programme includes an additional round, which has mainly been shown during a compilation or special episode of the programme:
 "Newsreel": An improvisation round, similar to the game of "Film Dub" from Whose Line Is It Anyway?, in which a panellist – primarily Hugh Dennis – is shown a piece of news footage with no sound, and must provide either a comedic commentary track, or vocal track of the people involved.
 "Between the lines": An improvisation round involving two panellists. One performs as a notable figure (e.g. a politician) conducting a press conference, while another acts as a "translator", comically stating what they "really" mean to say. For example, panellist A might be performing as the Prime Minister and say "We are making certain that schools are well provided with school meals", to which panellist B (always Hugh) might comically translate it as "We made a deal for cheap soup and biscuits from the Russians".

Panellists

The panellists were primarily comedians, including stand-up comedians, many of whom made multiple appearances. Hugh Dennis appeared in all episodes since the show's premiere in 2005, except for a special episode broadcast as part of David Walliams' 24 Hour Panel People. Alongside Dennis and Ó Briain, others appeared as regular panellists, including Rory Bremner (Series 1 and 2),  Frankie Boyle (Series 1 to 7),  Andy Parsons (Series 3 to 14), Russell Howard (Series 4 to 9), Chris Addison (Series 10 to 12) and Angela Barnes (Series 21).

Controversy and criticism
On several occasions, Mock the Week has been the source of complaints, due to some risqué comments made by the panellists and the show's extreme use of profanity (particularly during Frankie Boyle's tenure). In the first episode of Series 4, during a segment called "What The Queen Didn't Say in Her Christmas Message", Boyle made the comment: "I am now so old that my pussy is haunted." This led to the BBC's director general Mark Thompson being challenged about the comments on Newsnight. Boyle later quipped "That was three years ago. If it wasn't haunted then it certainly is now." In 2008, a larger controversy arose following another comment made by Boyle regarding swimmer Rebecca Adlington. Boyle stated that "she looks like someone who's looking at themselves in the back of a spoon". The BBC ruled that the jokes were indeed "humiliating" and "risked offending the audience", while also calling Boyle "a brilliant member of the team". Despite this, Adlington's agent said that simply admitting mistakes was not enough, saying: "By giving Frankie Boyle a rebuke they fail to discourage others from doing the same."

After leaving the show, Boyle criticised both the show's production team and the BBC Trust. He claims that the show did not cover enough major news stories and was too restrictive on his risqué comedy act, as the producers and the BBC Trust were afraid of "frightening the horses".

The lack of female guests on the programme has been the subject of complaints in the letters page of the Radio Times. Jo Brand, while criticising the male-dominated genre of comedy panel shows, said in 2009, "I don't do Mock the Week anymore and neither do some male stand-ups I know who have tried it once. We just don’t like the prospect of having to bite someone’s foot off before they let us say something."

In 2013, former panelist Rory Bremner stated his reasons for leaving the show, saying: "I felt that there was a new and highly competitive and quite aggressive tendency there and felt uncomfortable. But I've since found out that very few people have felt comfortable doing Mock the Week." He also criticised the way comedians like Linda Smith were treated by new comedians, who "are like prize fighters".

Official merchandise
A DVD, Mock the Week: Too Hot for TV was released on 26 November 2007. It contains almost three hours of material, including three extended episodes from series five, containing scenes that were considered too rude for broadcast. The three extended episodes are entitled, 'Putin, Henman & Konnie Huq', 'Nuts, Pies and Nim Nim Nim' and 'Money, Sex and The Lib Dems'.
Mock the Week: Too Hot for TV 2 was released on 9 November 2009. Again, the DVD contains the main 'Too Hot For TV' feature with a compilation of unseen footage, plus three extended episodes from the series archives titled, 'The Anal Lube Show', 'The Leg Show' and 'The Hedgehog Show'. The extended episodes have a total of more than 40 minutes of unseen material. Audio CD versions of both DVDs are available.
Mock the Week: Too Hot for TV 3 was released on 8 November 2010. Like the previous two, this DVD features an hour-long smut reel and three extended episodes titled 'The Elves and Testicles Show', 'The Prisons and Other Dodgy Stuff Show', and 'The Johnny Blowjob and Bird Flu Show'.

Boxtree published seven original tie-in books between 2008 and 2014, plus one which compiled the best of the first two books.

Mock the Week: Scenes We'd Like to See (August 2008)
Mock the Week: This Year's Book (September 2009)
Mock the Week: 1001 Jokes (January 2010, collected the best of the first two books, later published in paperback as Mock the Week: 1001 Scenes We'd Like to See)
Mock the Week: Next Year's Book (September 2010)
Mock the Week's Funniest Book of All Time (2011)
Mock the Week's Only Book You'll Ever Need (2012)Mock the Week's Ultimate Panic-Buy! (2013)Mock the Week's Brand Spanking New Scenes We'd Like to See'' (2014).

Transmissions

Original series

Specials

Mock the Week Looks Back At...

References

External links

 
 
 
 
 
 
 
 The BBC's Mock The Week YouTube playlist
 Mock the Week Video Clips on BBC Comedy

2005 British television series debuts
2022 British television series endings
2000s British game shows
2000s British satirical television series
2010s British game shows
2010s British satirical television series
2020s British game shows
2020s British satirical television series
BBC panel games
BBC satirical television shows
English-language television shows
Improvisational television series